Calhoun Community College is a public community college in Tanner, Alabama. It is the largest of the 24 two-year institutions that make up the Alabama Community College System.

History 
The college was founded in 1946 and named after John C. Calhoun, the 7th Vice President of the United States.  He was a War Hawk of 1812, hence the Calhoun athletic teams names.

Huntsville Campus 
The Huntsville Campus opened in 2006. The Sparkman Building was originally a Chrysler electronics factory. The building was purchased by Calhoun Community College for $4.5 million, which included $2 million for a 5-year cleanup of the site.

Construction of the Math, Science, and CIS building began in 2014, and was opened in 2016.

Campus 
In addition to its main  campus in Tanner, the college has sites at Huntsville/Cummings Research Park, the Alabama Center for the Arts in downtown Decatur, and at the Limestone Correctional Facility. The campus sits adjacent to Pryor Field Regional Airport along Highway 31.

Academics 
Calhoun serves just over 8,000 students. It offers 49 associate degree programs and 52 career and certificate programs. Of Calhoun's 302 full-time employees, 133 serve on the college faculty. Over 80% of the full-time faculty possess at least a master's degree and approximately 15 percent hold a doctorate.

Student life 
The Decatur campus serves as home for the Warhawks athletic teams.  Both baseball fields, and the Carlton Kelly Gymnasium, are housed on the campus.  Calhoun participates in baseball and softball in the Alabama Community College Conference.

Due to the small size of both Decatur and Austin High School's gymnasiums, the rivalry basketball game is held, each year, at the 3,000-seat Carlton Kelly Gymnasium, to accommodate the large crowds.  However, this gym is still not the correct size for the event as crowds up to 4,000 in size attempt to attend the event and upwards of 1,000 can be turned away at each rivalry game.

Notable alumni
Bo Bice, American Idol runner-up, graduated May 1997
John D. Douglas, basketball player (Los Angeles Clippers), coach, graduated 1976
Micky Hammon, Republican member and Majority Leader of the Alabama House of Representatives since 2002.
Jorge Posada, catcher, New York Yankees, graduated 1991
Gary Redus, Major League Baseball player, graduated 1977

See also
 List of colleges and universities in Alabama

References

External links
Official website

 
Community colleges in Alabama
Decatur metropolitan area, Alabama
Education in Morgan County, Alabama
Education in Limestone County, Alabama
Huntsville-Decatur, AL Combined Statistical Area
Universities and colleges accredited by the Southern Association of Colleges and Schools
Universities and colleges in Huntsville, Alabama
NJCAA athletics